Santa Fe Uprising is a 1946 American Western film in the Red Ryder film series directed by R. G. Springsteen, written by Earle Snell, and starring Allan Lane, Robert Blake, Martha Wentworth, Barton MacLane, Jack La Rue and Tom London. It was released on November 15, 1946, by Republic Pictures.

Plot
A scheming newspaper publisher, Crawford, conspires with the wealthy Madison Pike and a pair of henchmen, Jackson and Case, to make the New Mexico Territory's citizens of Bitter Springs pay a toll to use a private road. Pike is then ambushed and killed.

Red Ryder's aunt, a rancher known to all as The Duchess, believes herself to be Pike's only legal heir. When she sends Red to stake her claim, Crawford and others attempt to ruin her, then kill her, but Red and sidekick Little Beaver head off her runaway stagecoach.

Red is appointed town marshal and attempts to get to the bottom of a scheme. Little Beaver is kidnapped by Jackson, but by pretending to be shot with a gun filled with blanks, Red is able to surprise the killers and thieves and restore order to Bitter Springs.

Cast  
Allan Lane as Red Ryder
Robert Blake as Little Beaver 
Martha Wentworth as The Duchess
Barton MacLane as Crawford
Jack La Rue as Bruce Jackson
Tom London as Lafe Dibble
Dick Curtis as Henchman Luke Case
Forrest Taylor as Moore
Emmett Lynn as Deputy Hank
Hank Patterson as Deputy Jake
Pat Michaels as Sonny Dibble
Edmund Cobb as Madison Pike
Kenne Duncan as Rustler talking with Jackson
Edythe Elliott as Mrs. Dibble

References

External links 
 

1946 films
American Western (genre) films
1946 Western (genre) films
Republic Pictures films
Films directed by R. G. Springsteen
Films based on comic strips
Films based on American comics
American black-and-white films
Films set in New Mexico
Films shot in Los Angeles
1940s English-language films
1940s American films
Red Ryder films